Taylor's University (commonly referred to as Taylor's) is a private university in Subang Jaya, Selangor, Malaysia. It is often regarded as Malaysia's top private university in Malaysia based on the QS World University Rankings.

It was founded in 1969 as a college, was awarded university college status in 2006, and university status in 2010.

Taylor's University is a member of the Taylor's Education Group, which also includes British University Vietnam, Taylor’s College, Garden International School, Nexus International School, Australian International School Malaysia, and Taylor’s International School.

History
In 2006, Taylor’s was granted ‘University College’ status, which resulted in two distinct identities under the tertiary arm of the brand – Taylor’s College and Taylor’s University College.

Work commenced to build the RM450 million Taylor's University Lakeside Campus, in Subang Jaya, in early 2007 and was completed in January 2010.

Officially awarded as a full-fledged university status in September 2010 by the Ministry of Higher Education Malaysia, Taylor’s is now one of the nation’s leading private higher education institutions.

Lakeside Campus

Taylor's University established its Lakeside Campus in 2010 to accommodate the ever-expanding number of students. On the grounds of the campus itself lies Syopz, a commercial block with restaurants and shops. U Residence, the official accommodation for students, is also located there.

In 2011, Taylor’s received the Special Honour Award from the Institute of Landscape Architects Malaysia in Category 3: Professional Awards in Landscape Design and Planning. The Lakeside Campus was awarded in all three building categories of Interior Design, Architecture and Landscape.

Research and enterprise
The Taylor's University Research and Enterprise department is segregated into three components: Centre for Higher Degrees by Research (CHDR) – managing postgraduate research programmes with the Schools; Centre for Research Management (CRM) – focuses on providing information and services for grant applications, management and tracking of grants, assess research progress and overall coordination of the university’s strategic research objectives; and the Centre for Knowledge Transfer & Commercialisation (KTC) – leveraging on intellectual capital to commercialise products from research findings.

Notable alumni

Business 
 Khalila Mbowe, founder and chief executive officer of Unleashed Africa Company Limited

Sports 
Syakilla Salni Jefry Krisnan, gold medalist, 2014 Asian Games

Media and entertainment 
 Vanessa Tevi Kumares, Miss Universe Malaysia 2015
 Charmaine Chew, Miss Universe Malaysia 2018 finalist, Miss International 2019 finalist
 Serene Lim Shyi Yee (zh), actor

Others 
 Ainan Celeste Cawley, Singaporean child prodigy

References

1969 establishments in Malaysia
Business schools in Malaysia
Design schools in Malaysia
Educational institutions established in 1969
Hospitality schools in Malaysia
Information technology schools in Malaysia
Medical schools in Malaysia
Private universities and colleges in Malaysia
Universities and colleges in Selangor